The Forty-Fourth Wisconsin Legislature convened from  to  in regular session.

Senators representing odd-numbered districts were newly elected for this session and were serving the first two years of a four-year term. Assembly members were elected to a two-year term. Assembly members and odd-numbered senators were elected in the general election of November 8, 1898. Senators representing even-numbered districts were serving the third and fourth year of a four-year term, having been elected in the general election of November 3, 1896.

Major events
 February 2, 1899: Joseph V. Quarles was elected United States Senator by the Wisconsin Legislature in joint session, after 93 ballots in the Republican caucus.
 February 4, 1899: United States Army occupation forces at Manila opened fire against armed Philippine militia, who were demanding Philippine independence, inciting the Philippine–American War.
 March 14, 1899: USS Philadelphia took control of the Samoan capital Apia in the midst of the Second Samoan Civil War.
 June 12, 1899: The 1899 New Richmond tornado completely destroyed the city of New Richmond, Wisconsin.
 November 21, 1899: Vice President of the United States Garret Hobart died in office.
 December 2, 1899: The Tripartite Convention in Washington, D.C., ended the Second Samoan Civil War by dividing the territory into a German-administered colony and an American-administered colony.
 March 14, 1900: The United States Gold Standard Act goes into effect, fixing the value of the U.S. dollar to a specific gold weight.
 November 6, 1900: 1900 United States general election:
 Robert M. "Fighting Bob" La Follette elected Governor of Wisconsin.
 William McKinley re-elected President of the United States.

Major legislation
 March  30, 1899: An Act to provide for the registration of all persons now engaged in the practice of medicine and surgery in the state of Wisconsin, who were engaged in such practice on or before the first day of July, 1897, 1899 Act 87.
 Joint Resolution proposing to amend section 10, of article 8, of the constitution of Wisconsin, relating to good roads, 1899 Joint Resolution 1.  Proposed an amendment to the state constitution to exempt spending on roads from constitutional limitations on deficit spending.
 Joint Resolution proposing an amendment to article 11 of the constitution of Wisconsin, giving the legislature power to pass a general banking law, 1899 Joint Resolution 13.

Summary

Senate summary

Assembly summary

Sessions
 1st Regular session: January 11, 1899May 4, 1899

Leaders

Senate leadership
 President of the Senate: Jesse Stone (R) 
 President pro tempore: Lyman W. Thayer (R)

Assembly leadership
 Speaker of the Assembly: George H. Ray (R)

Members

Members of the Senate
Members of the Senate for the Forty-Fourth Wisconsin Legislature:

Members of the Assembly
Members of the Assembly for the Forty-Fourth Wisconsin Legislature:

Committees

Senate committees
 Senate Committee on AgricultureWhelan, chair
 Senate Committee on Assessment and Collection of TaxesWhitehead, chair
 Senate Committee on Bills on Third ReadingEaton, chair
 Senate Committee on CorporationsDevos, chair
 Senate Committee on EducationStout, chair
 Senate Committee on Enrolled BillsWoodworth, chair
 Senate Committee on Engrossed BillsWhitman, chair
 Senate Committee on Federal RelationsMills, chair
 Senate Committee on Finance, Banks and InsuranceRoehr, chair
 Senate Committee on the JudiciaryLamoreux, chair
 Senate Committee on Legislative ExpensesReynolds, chair
 Senate Committee on ManufacturesAnson, chair
 Senate Committee on Military AffairsWelton, chair
 Senate Committee on Privileges and ElectionsJones, chair
 Senate Committee on Public HealthMailer, chair
 Senate Committee on Public LandsDennett, chair
 Senate Committee on RailroadsWithee, chair
 Senate Committee on Roads and BridgesThayer, chair
 Senate Committee on State AffairsMcGillivray, chair
 Senate Committee on Town and County OrganizationsRiordans, chair

Assembly committees
 Assembly Committee on AgricultureWylie, chair
 Assembly Committee on Assessment and Collection of TaxesHall, chair
 Assembly Committee on Bills on Third ReadingPorter, chair
 Assembly Committee on CitiesF. B. Keene, chair
 Assembly Committee on CorporationsOverbeck, chair
 Assembly Committee on Dairy and FoodS. D. Slade, chair
 Assembly Committee on EducationDresser, chair
 Assembly Committee on Enrolled BillsButtles, chair
 Assembly Committee on Engrossed BillsFogo, chair
 Assembly Committee on Federal RelationsSarau, chair
 Assembly Committee on Finance, Banks and InsuranceBuffington, chair
 Assembly Committee on the JudiciaryWheeler, chair
 Assembly Committee on Legislative ExpendituresJ. R. Farr, chair
 Assembly Committee on Lumber and MiningH. A. Ripley, chair
 Assembly Committee on ManufacturesZinn, chair
 Assembly Committee on Military AffairsRusk, chair
 Assembly Committee on Privileges and ElectionsMcDonald, chair
 Assembly Committee on Public Health and SanitationJohnson, chair
 Assembly Committee on Public ImprovementsJ. H. Wells, chair
 Assembly Committee on Public LandsPolley, chair
 Assembly Committee on RailroadsJ. W. Thomas, chair
 Assembly Committee on Roads and BridgesA. Jensen, chair
 Assembly Committee on State AffairsT. J. McGrath, chair
 Assembly Committee on Town and County OrganizationsJ. E. Morgan, chair
 Assembly Committee on Ways and MeansG. Schoenbaum, chair

Joint committees
 Joint Committee on Charitable and Penal InstitutionsStebbins (Sen.) & William H. Hurlbut (Asm.), co-chairs
 Joint Committee on ClaimsBaxter (Sen.) & John M. True (Asm.), co-chairs
 Joint Committee on Fish and GameGreen (Sen.) & L. C. Harvey (Asm.), co-chairs
 Joint Committee on PrintingMunson (Sen.) & William M. Fogo (Asm.), co-chairs

Employees

Senate employees
 Chief Clerk: Walter Houser
 Journal Clerk: Henry C. Schultz
 Bookkeeper: Andrew Rood
 Engrossing Clerk: F. E. Andrews
 Assistant Engrossing Clerk: E. P. Bennett
 Enrolling Clerk: H. E. Polly 
 Enrollment Clerk: Ed. Schaffland
 Proofreader: F. W. Bruce
 Index Clerk: J. C. McFarland
 Assistant Index Clerk: R. H. Clark
 Clerk for the Judiciary Committee: M. Schmidt
 Clerk for the Committee on Bills on 3rd Reading: Joseph Elliott
 Clerk for the Committee on Engrossed Bills: Irene Whitman
 Clerk for the Committee on Incorporations: M. P. Schmitt
 Clerk for the Committee on Claims: W. H. Burk
 Clerk for the Committee on State Affairs: I. S. Dunn
 Stenographer: G. E. Dixon
 Clerks: 
 Will F. Cody
 A. R. Mead
 Document Clerks: 
 F. W. Meinke
 Ben. S. Thayer
 Comparing Clerks:
 Edwin Blair
 M. S. Cyboruski
 D. Graham
 W. J. Hocking
 Sergeant-at-Arms: Charles A. Pettibone
 Assistant Sergeant-at-Arms: A. F. Wright
 Postmaster: Christoph Paulus
 Assistant Postmaster: H. M. Knowlton
 Committee Room Attendants: 
 F. F. Massart
 J. D. Corlett
 Doorkeepers:
 R. E. Tilden
 H. M. Allen
 Night Watch: J. G. Taylor
 Janitor: Ross Preston
 Custodian: Louis Ehlieter
 Custodian of the Engrossing Room: H. Roener
 Custodian of the Enrolling Room: Joseph S. Green
 Messengers:
 Dana L. Woodworth
 Harry C. May
 R. C. Stolhand
 Loyd Jones
 Edgar Mills
 M. Johnson

Assembly employees
 Chief Clerk: Winslow A. Nowell
 Assistant Chief Clerk: Frederic W. Coon
 Journal Clerks:
 Carleton H. Wells
 Fred Nelson
 Bookkeepers: 
 Jos. B. Foster
 Claire Currier
 Stenographers:
 Clarence C. Fish
 Almeda Sturdevant
 Document Clerks:
 John H. Johnson
 M. L. Burdick
 Engrossing Clerk: Lawrence H. Berges
 Assistant Engrossing Clerk: Albert C. Brownell
 Enrolling Clerk: Charles W. Blay
 Assistant Enrolling Clerk: Albert J. Wolf
 Index Clerk: Fred H. Hartwell
 Assistant Index Clerk: C. E. Shaffer
 Stationary Clerk: Henry H. McGraw
 Proof Reader: John H. Frazier
 Comparing Clerks:
 Mary E. Chadwick
 Anna Haseltine
 Nellie L. Proctor
 Alluna Christie
 Clerk for the Judiciary Committee: Henry S. Sloan
 Clerk for the Committee on Bills on 3rd Reading: J. D. Stuart
 Clerk for the Committee on Enrolled Bills: J. T. Atwater
 Clerk for the Committee on Engrossed Bills: Emma C. Fogo
 Clerk for the Committee on State Affairs: William H. Field
 Sergeant-at-Arms: James H. Agen
 Assistant Sergeant-at-Arms: B. C. Walters
 Postmaster: H. F. Dinsmore
 Assistant Postmaster: C. L. Turney
 Doorkeepers:
 Joseph Goss
 H. H. Reynolds
 N. F. Pierce
 D. Ray
 Gallery Attendants:
 H. T. Mower
 John Grootemaat
 Day Attendant: H. J. Conlin
 Porter: Herman Miller
 Flagman: D. Thiele
 Night Watch: A. C. Hoover
 Custodian of the Enrolling Room: Andrew Nelson
 Custodian of the Engrossing Room: William Eggert
 Committee Room Custodians:
 H. F. Pagel
 Ralph C. Pickering
 Cloak Room Attendants:
 Martin Thompson
 F. G. Dahlberg
 Pages:
 Goodworth Lillisand
 Walter Nebel
 Albert Haven
 Willie Doty
 Arthur Funking
 Solli Cooper
 Geo Blanchard
 Earl V. Agen
 Hubert Ford
 Stanley Morse
 John Colling
 Thomas Lloyd

References

External links
 1899: Related Documents from Wisconsin Legislature

1899 in Wisconsin
1900 in Wisconsin
Wisconsin
Wisconsin legislative sessions